A jumpsuit is a one-piece garment with sleeves and legs and typically without integral coverings for feet, hands or head. The original jump suit is the functional one-piece garment used by parachutists. 

The original skydivers' jumpsuits were simple garments designed to insulate the body from the colder temperatures associated with higher altitudes and minimize the risk of covering important handles and grips. Today, however, the garment has found other uses.

Jumpsuits are generally regarded as a garment of convenience, especially for entertainers, as they are simpler, lighter and more flexible to wear.  They have become  more of a put on and remove garment than an ensemble outfit.   However, unless the jumpsuit has an opening on the rear (a "drop seat"), it is necessary to remove it entirely for bathroom use.

History of a jumpsuit
A jumpsuit is a one-piece dress which fits slim and covers the arms and legs. Its history goes back to 1919. It was created as a functional garment for parachutists to jump from planes. The boiler suit and dungarees were also used for a similar purpose.
Amongst the three utility wear garments (jumpsuits, boiler suits and dungarees) jumpsuits were the first one to become fashion wear. The reason was its slimmer cut.

In the 1930s, fashion designer Elsa Schiaparelli began designing jumpsuits for women. Her designs were the talk of the town but were worn by only a few. 
Then came the sporty styles by the American designer Vera Maxwell in the mid-1940s. It was popular but was a novelty item. 

During the Second World War, jumpsuits were worn by women for their usefulness. 
In the 1950s, American designers like Bonnie Cashin started designing evening jumpsuits. But it was another decade before jumpsuits became popular as day and evening wear. The jumpsuit first appeared in Vogue in September 1964. Guy Laroche wore a brown jersey jumpsuit paired with a sealskin jacket and it was photographed by Irving Penn. It became a popular trend within a few months and two “moon shot”-style jumpsuits in white jerseys featured as Vogue patterns in January 1965.

The late 1960s and 1970s were very important years for the jumpsuit. They were made as sportswear, in leather one-pieces and also as embellished designs for evening. Jumpsuits found a place in every designer's designs. In the 1970s jumpsuit was a unisex outfit. Cher and Elvis wore some stylish jumpsuits during their stage performances. The famous American designer Geoffrey Beene called the jumpsuit “the ballgown of the next century”. But it became out of fashion for the next decade. Nicolas Ghesquière tried to bring it back in 2002 by designing it in different fabrics and patterns. Updated jumpsuit again gained popularity. And thus the style was relaunched. Easy to wear, versatile and a little bit feisty, the jumpsuit can be called a modern wardrobe staple.

Pilots and drivers
Aviators and astronauts sometimes wear insulated, fire-retardant jumpsuits or flight suits where other types of clothing can potentially float or flap about in zero gravity or during high-G maneuvers.

Drivers in motor racing wear jumpsuits for protection against fire (called a fire suit) and (in the case of motorcycle racers) leather suits for abrasion.

Prisoners

Short-sleeved jumpsuits are common as a prison uniform, particularly in the United States. The clothing is a convenient way to determine who is an inmate and who is a corrections officer. Although bright orange uniforms are still in use, some institutions changed for other colors as orange jumpsuits became fashionable due to the influence of the Netflix series Orange is the New Black. Furthermore, color-coded uniforms are fairly commonly used where different colors signify the inmate's custody level or issues like gender, potential safety risks, disciplinary history, severity of current charges and past convictions. Some institutions even went back to striped uniforms to prevent escaped inmates from being mistaken for sanitation, utility or highway workers.

See also 
 Boilersuit
 Catsuit
 Flight suit
 Hazmat suit
 Onesie (jumpsuit)
 Prison uniform
 Romper suit
 Speedsuit

References 

One-piece suits
Protective gear
20th-century fashion
21st-century fashion